Armand Hammer (May 21, 1898 – December 10, 1990) was an American business manager and owner, most closely associated with Occidental Petroleum, a company he ran from 1957 until his death. Called "Lenin's chosen capitalist" by the press, he was also known for his art collection and his close ties to the Soviet Union. 

Hammer's business interests around the world and his "citizen diplomacy" helped him cultivate a wide network of friends and associates.

Early life
Armand Hammer was born in New York City to Jewish parents who emigrated from what was then the Russian Empire: Rose (née Lipschitz) and Julius Hammer. His father came to the United States from Odessa (now Ukraine) in 1875 and settled in the Bronx, where he ran a general medical practice and five drugstores. After the Russian Revolution, a part of the Socialist Labor Party of America (SLP) under Julius' leadership split off to become a founding element of the Communist Party USA which supported Vladimir Lenin and Bolshevism. As administrative head, commercial attaché, and financial advisor of the Ludwig Martens-led Russian Soviet Government Bureau, Julius Hammer was assigned to generate support for the Russian Soviet Government Bureau and funded the Soviet Russian Bureau by money laundering the proceeds from illegal sales of smuggled diamonds through his company Allied Drug, while his Allied Drug partner, Abraham A. Heller, headed the Soviet Bureau's commercial department. Julius Hammer and Heller traveled extensively across the United States both to stop the embargo of Soviet Russia and to increase United States trade with Soviet Russia along with improving the image of Bolsheviks who were overwhelmingly despised by American socialists. During the United States embargo against Soviet Russia, Julius Hammer used his Allied Drug and Chemical as a front to smuggle items and materials between the United States and Soviet Russia through Riga. After the Lusk Committee supported police raid of the Soviet Russian Government Bureau on June 12, 1919, Ludwig Martens escaped and went underground, often hiding at Hammer's home. On December 18, 1920 Martens was deported and returned to Soviet Russia in January 1921.

Hammer originally said that his father had named him after a character, Armand Duval, in La Dame aux Camélias, a novel by Alexandre Dumas. According to other sources,  Hammer later was said to be named after the "arm and hammer" graphic symbol of the SLP, in which his father had a leadership role. Late in his life, Hammer confirmed that this was indeed the origin of his given name.

Father's imprisonment
Due to his socialist and communist activities, Hammer's father Julius had been put under federal surveillance. On July 5, 1919, federal agents witnessed Marie Oganesoff (the 33-year-old Russian wife of a former tsarist diplomat) entering Julius's medical office located in a wing of his Bronx home. Oganesoff, "who had accumulated a life-threatening history of miscarriages, abortions, and poor health, was pregnant and wanted to terminate her pregnancy." The surgical procedure took place in the midst of a great flu epidemic. Six days after the abortion Oganesoff died of pneumonia. Four weeks after her death a Bronx County grand jury indicted Julius Hammer for first-degree manslaughter. The following summer, a criminal prosecutor convinced a jury that Julius Hammer had let his patient "die like a dog" and that the claims that she had actually died from complications due to influenza were mere attempts to cover up his crime. In 1920, a judge sentenced Julius Hammer to three and a half years in Sing Sing prison.

While most historians (such as Beverly Gage and Nigel West
) state that Julius had performed the abortion, an opposing position has been put forward by author Edward Jay Epstein, who in his book Dossier: The Secret History of Armand Hammer puts forward the claim that it was Armand Hammer, then a medical student, rather than his father who performed the abortion and his father Julius assumed the blame. Epstein's claims come from interview comments made by Bettye Murphy, who had been Armand's mistress. According to Murphy and Epstein's account, the legal strategy was that Julius did not deny that an abortion had been performed, but insisted that it had been medically necessary and that a licensed doctor rather than a medical student would be more convincing in presenting that argument.

Allied Drug
After the Soviet Russian Government Bureau closed, Allied Drug's smuggling activities between the United States and Soviet Russia ceased, which caused Allied Drug to gain enormous debts from storing large amounts of unpaid items in warehouses in New York and Riga. In March 1921, Ludwig Martens sent a letter from Moscow through the Soviet mission in Tallinn to Julius Hammer, who was imprisoned at Sing Sing until 1924, granting his Allied Drug and Chemical concessions for trade with Soviet Russia and requested an Allied Drug representative to be present in Soviet Russia.

When his father was imprisoned, Hammer and his brother took Allied Drug, the family business, to new heights, reselling equipment they had bought at depressed prices at the end of World War I. According to Hammer, his first business success was in 1919, manufacturing and selling a ginger extract, which legally contained high levels of alcohol. This was extremely popular during Prohibition, and the company had $1 million in sales that year.

Family envoy in Soviet Union
While Julius was imprisoned, he sent Armand Hammer, who could not speak any Russian, to the Soviet Union to look after the affairs of Allied Drug and Chemical. Hammer traveled back and forth from the Soviet Union for the next 10 years. In the meantime, Hammer graduated from Columbia College in 1919 and received his medical degree from the Columbia College of Physicians and Surgeons in 1921.

In 1921, while waiting for his internship to begin at Bellevue Hospital, Hammer went to the Soviet Union for a trip that lasted until late 1930. Although his career in medicine was cut short, he relished being referred to as "Dr. Hammer". Hammer's intentions in the 1921 trip have been debated ever since. He has claimed that he originally intended to recoup $150,000 in debts for drugs shipped during the Allied intervention, but was soon moved by a capitalistic and philanthropic interest in selling wheat to the then-starving Russians. In his passport application, Hammer stated that he intended to visit only Western Europe. J. Edgar Hoover in the Justice Department knew this was false, but Hammer was allowed to travel, anyway. The 26-year-old Hoover, who was the Justice Department's expert on subversives, was tipped off that Armand Hammer was a courier for the COMINTERN and ensured that foreign intelligence agencies were notified of Armand Hammer's travels. A skeptical U.S. government watched him through this trip and for the rest of his life.

Career

Early Soviet ventures

First trip to Russia 
After leaving Columbia Medical School, Hammer extended earlier entrepreneurial ventures with a successful business importing many goods from and exporting pharmaceuticals to the newly formed Soviet Union, together with his younger brother Victor. The blockade of Soviet Russia had ended for most items in February 1921, and on July 5, 1921, he departed New York on his first trip to Soviet Russia as Allied Drug's representative in Soviet Russia. Prior to his departure, he visited Charles Recht, Lenin's United States attorney that supported Soviet Russia's best interests in the United States and whose law office was in the same building that the former Soviet Russian Government Bureau had occupied, and Recht gave Hammer a package to deliver to Ludwig Martens in Moscow. During this first visit, Armand Hammer allowed the Chekists, the Soviet secret police who later became known as the KGB, to take control of Allied Drug and Chemical.

Asbestos concession 
During his time in Soviet Russia and later the Soviet Union, he perfected bribery and money-laundering techniques, which were exposed later in the 1960s and 1970s during which he tape-recorded his payoffs. After returning to the United States, Hammer stated that Lenin had granted him an asbestos concession for 25 years to mine asbestos from the Urals in Soviet Russia. According to Hammer, on his initial trip, he took $60,000 in medical supplies to aid in a typhus epidemic and made a deal with Lenin for furs, caviar, and jewelry expropriated by the Soviet state in exchange for a million bushels (27,216 tons) shipment of surplus American wheat.

Lenin New Economic Policy 
During Lenin's New Economic Policy, Armand Hammer became the mediator for 38 international companies in their dealings with the USSR. Before Lenin's death, Hammer negotiated the import of Fordson tractors into the USSR, which served a major role in agricultural mechanization in the country. Later, after Stalin came to power, additional deals were negotiated with Hammer as an American–Soviet negotiator.

Hammer's move to Soviet Union 
He moved to the USSR in the 1920s to oversee these operations, especially his large business manufacturing and exporting pens and pencils. According to Alexander Barmine, who was assigned by the Central Committee to run the Mezhdunarodnaya Kniga company to compete with Hammer, the stationery concession to produce such items in the Soviet Union was actually granted to Julius Hammer. Barmine states the party spent five million gold rubles on stationery supplies made in factories controlled by Julius Hammer and other concessionaires, making them rich. Barmine further contends that the Soviets were eventually able to duplicate certain items such as typewriter parts and pens, and end those concessions, but were never able to match the quality of Hammer's pencils, so that concession became permanent. Armand Hammer remained in the Soviet Union until 1930.

Return to the United States 
Back in the United States, Hammer was bequeathed a few Fabergé eggs by the Soviets between 1930 and 1933. The authenticity of the artifacts was questioned. According to Géza von Habsburg, Armand's brother Victor Hammer stated Stalin's trade commissar Anastas Mikoyan provided Fabergé hallmarking tools to Armand to sell fakes, and Victor stated a 1938 New York sale he ran with Armand, which grossed several million dollars, consisted of both authentic and inauthentic items (called Fauxbergé by Habsburg), with commissions going back to Mikoyan. Although certainly some fakes were produced, on close examination many of the so-called fake items turned out to actually be from various workshops, particularly that of Henrik Wigstrom, and had been appropriated by the Soviet government when they closed the Faberge company. As the items were either unfinished or not ready for retail sale, many were not hallmarked, so Hammer and his associates finished the work.

In his 1983 book, Red Carpet, author Joseph Finder discusses Hammer's "extensive involvement with Russia." In Dossier: The Secret History of Armand Hammer, Edward Jay Epstein called Hammer "a virtual spy" for the Soviet Union.

Oil company, Libya deals, and return to Soviet negotiation 
After returning to the US, Hammer entered into a diverse array of business, art, cultural, and humanitarian endeavors, including investing in various U.S. oil-production efforts. 

He gained enormous wealth through his United Distillers of America, which was a 1933 established firm known as the A. Hammer Cooperage Corporation until 1946, when it changed its name to United Distillers of America Ltd. In early 1944, Hammer purchased American Distilling Co. and a former New Market, New Hampshire, rum distillery at which his American Distilling employee, Dr. Hanns G. Maister, began producing the first United States-made potato-based spirit, which was a vodka, and also produced a blended whiskey that was retailed through the cooperage's account with West Shore. After a B-25 plane crashed into the north face of the 79th floor of the Empire State Building on a foggy Saturday the 28th of July in 1945, Hammer purchased the damaged 78th floor, refurbished it, and made it the headquarters of his United Distillers of America. 

His oil investments were later parlayed into control of Occidental Petroleum (Oxy) which he obtained in 1956. Through his Occidental Petroleum and its stakes in Libya, Hammer was pivotal in breaking the tight grip that the major United States domestic producers had on the price of oil, and instead gave OPEC control over oil prices. Arthur Andersen was Oxy's auditor. National Geographic described Occidental chairman Hammer as "a pioneer in the synfuels boom." 

In 1973, Libya nationalized 51% of Oxy's holdings in Libya. In 1974, Armand Hammer announced a 35-year oil exploration agreement with Libya, the first such agreement signed by Libya after Muammar Gaddafi came to power in September 1969. By the 1974 deal, 81% of the oil extracted by Occidental Petroleum was go to the Libyan government, with only 19% retained by Occidental Petroleum. At the time, Oxy was the second largest producer of oil in Libya, and Libya was the company's only major source of crude. The Libyan government continually threatened the assets of the company, who would usually give into Gaddafi's demands.

Throughout his life Hammer continued personal and business dealings with the Soviet Union, despite the Cold War. In later years, he lobbied and traveled extensively at a great personal expense, working for peace between the United States and the Communist countries of the world, including ferrying physicians and supplies into the Soviet Union to help Chernobyl survivors. In his book The Prize, Daniel Yergin writes that Hammer "ended up as a go-between for five Soviet General Secretaries and seven U.S. Presidents."

Détente
Through Hammer's closeness to Yuri Andropov, Andropov assigned Mikhail Ilyich Bruk (1923 Moscow – 2009 Jurmala) also called Mike or Michael Brook or Brooke, who was an English-Russian translator, as Hammer's personal ambassador and expediter and was present as Hammer's translator at all meetings between Armand Hammer and Soviet leaders in the Soviet Union beginning in 1964. Bruk had been a technical translator at the first Pugwash conference called the Thinkers' Lodge held in July 1957. According to Armand Hammer, "Mike's KGB."

In early 1969, Armand Hammer obtained control of Eaton's Tower International through which Hammer would have a controlling majority stake in Tower International in exchange for Hammer's Occidental Petroleum assuming the debts of Tower International and Eaton receiving 45% of any profits from Tower International's future projects.

Trade deals between Nixon and Brezhnev 
After Nixon, as the first United States President to visit the Soviet Union, traveled to Moscow for a summit that ended on June 1, 1972, Hammer traveled to Moscow arriving July 14, 1972, and, with Sargent Shriver as his legal advisor, negotiated the first trade agreement between the United States and the Soviet Union following Nixon's summit. Six weeks prior to Nixon's departure, Hammer personally gave Maurice Stans, the finance chairman of Nixon's campaign fund, $46,000 in cash from a numbered bank account in Switzerland which Hammer used as his slush fund money. Later, in September 1972 Hammer gave Nixon's campaign fund an additional $54,000 from the same Swiss bank account amounting to a total of $100,000 that Hammer donated to Nixon's campaign fund. On July 18, 1972, Hammer returned to the United States through London and called Tim Babcock, Hammer's lobbyist for the Nixon administration, to have him arrange a meeting with Nixon through H. R. Haldeman, who was Nixon's chief of staff, in order to debrief the President about Hammer's trade deal which occurred on July 20, 1972.

During détente in July 1972, Armand Hammer negotiated a twenty year agreement with Brezhnev of the Soviet Union that was signed by Hammer in April 1973 in which the Hammer controlled firms Occidental Petroleum and Tower International would export to the Soviet Union, and later Russia, phosphate, which Occidental mined in northern Florida, in return for the Soviet Union, and later Russia, exporting from Odessa through Hammer's firms natural gas that would be converted into ammonia, potash, and urea. This fertilizer deal was to continue until Hammer's 100th birthday in 1998. JaxPort at the Port of Jacksonville in Jacksonville, Florida, was the United States port through which this trade occurred. Nixon encouraged the Export-Import Bank to finance in part the deal, valued at $20 billion over 20 years, and fund the Soviet construction of four ammonia plants in the greater Volga region, and a pipeline connecting them to the port at Odessa.

The Port of Pivdenny was known as "Grigorievsky" until 1978 and as the Port of Yuzhne from 1978 until 17 April 2019 when the port was renamed from the Russian word to the Ukrainian word for southern.

Illegal financial support of Nixon's Watergate fund
Politically, Hammer was a strong supporter of the Republican Party. Hammer anonymously gave $46,000 to support Nixon before a 1971 law took effect on April 7, 1972, which banned political contributions both anonymous and through another person. Later, in September 1972, Armand Hammer made an additional three illegal contributions totaling $54,000 to Richard Nixon's Watergate fund through friends of former Montana Governor Tim Babcock, who was Hammer's vice president of Occidental Petroleum, after which both Hammer and Babcock plead guilty to charges involving illegal contributions. Hammer received probation and a $3,000 fine. In August 1989, US President George H. W. Bush pardoned Hammer for the illegal contributions to aid Nixon's re-election in 1972.

Association with the Gore family
A 2003 interview with Aleksey Mitrofanov erroneously places the Hammer and Gore families close to each other in Europe. Occidental's coal interests were represented for many years by attorney and former U.S. Senator Al Gore Sr., among others. Gore, who had a longtime close friendship with Hammer, became the head of the subsidiary Island Creek Coal Company, upon his election loss in the Senate in November 1970. Much of Occidental's coal and phosphate production was in Tennessee, the state Gore represented in the Senate, and Gore owned shares in the company. Former Vice President Al Gore Jr. received much criticism from environmentalists, when the shares passed to the estate after the death of Gore Sr., and Gore Jr. was a son and the executor of the estate. Gore Jr. did not exercise control over the shares, which were eventually sold when the estate closed.

Hammer was very fond of Gore Jr. and, in 1984, under Hammer's guidance, Gore Jr. sought Tennessee's Senate office previously held by Howard Baker. Hammer supposedly promised Gore Sr. that he could make his son the president of the United States. It was under Hammer's encouragement and support that Gore Jr. sought the Democratic Party presidential nomination in 1988.

Stake in Arm & Hammer
In the 1980s Hammer owned a considerable amount of stock in Church & Dwight, the company that manufactures Arm & Hammer products; he also served on its board of directors. However, the Arm & Hammer company's brand name did not originate with Armand Hammer. It was in use 31 years before Hammer was born. While Hammer and Occidental said that the Church & Dwight investment was a coincidence, Hammer acknowledged previously trying to buy the Arm & Hammer brand as a result of often being asked about it.

President's Cancer Panel 
In 1981, Hammer was appointed by US President Ronald Reagan to serve on the three-member President's Cancer Panel and he later served as chairman of the panel from 1984 to 1989. As chairman of the panel, he announced a campaign to raise $1 billion a year to fight cancer.

Other activities and pursuits
He was a collector of Impressionist and Post-Impressionist paintings. His personal donation forms the core of the permanent collection of the UCLA Hammer Museum in Los Angeles, California. Together with his brother Victor, he was the owner of the "Hammer Galleries" in New York City. Hammer purchased Knoedler, the oldest art gallery in America, in 1971.

Hammer was a philanthropist, supporting causes related to education, medicine, and the arts. Among his legacies is the Armand Hammer United World College of the American West (now generally called the UWC-USA, part of the United World Colleges). Together with his friends Harry and Rosa Strygler, he also supported several Jewish foundations, particularly those associated with the Holocaust.

Hammer hungered for a Nobel Peace Prize, and he was repeatedly nominated for one, including by Menachem Begin, but never won.

In 1986, Forbes magazine estimated his net worth at $200 million.

Hammer made a guest appearance on a 1988 episode of The Cosby Show (as the grandfather of a friend of Theo Huxtable's who was suffering from cancer), saying that a cure for cancer was imminent.

Hammer was leading Occidental in 1988 when its oil rig, Piper Alpha, exploded, killing 167 men. The Cullen Report highlighted failings in many areas on the platform.

Due to his closeness to the future Charles III, then Prince of Wales, he was figuratively called a godfather to one of the Prince's children. It has been reported that Charles intended to make Hammer Prince William's godfather but was forced to abandon these plans as Princess Diana disliked the idea. In the 1980s, Hammer gave strong financial support to Prince Charles's projects of nearly 40 million pounds and free use of Hammer's Boeing 727.

As of 2016, he has been the subject of six biographies: in 1975 (Considine, authorized biography), 1985 (Bryson, coffee table book), Weinberg 1989, Blumay 1992, Epstein 1996, and Alef 2009; and two autobiographies (1932 and a bestseller in 1987). His art collection, The Armand Hammer Collection: Four Centuries of Masterpieces, published by the Armand Hammer Foundation in multiple editions, eventually became five centuries of masterpieces, sometimes in conjunction with museums where the collection was displayed. and his philanthropic projects were the subject of numerous publications.

Awards
In 1978, Hammer, as a non-citizen of the Soviet Union, received the Soviet Union's award the Order of Friendship of Peoples from Leonid Brezhnev because of his strong support of both the International Workers and Communist movement and the needs of the Soviet Union. By the time of his death, Hammer received other awards including:
 Golden Plate Award of the American Academy of Achievement (1978) 

 US: National Medal of Arts (1987)
 France: Legion of Honor
 Italy: Grand Officer of the Order of Merit of the Italian Republic (1 August 1981)
 Sweden: Royal Order of the Polar Star
 Austria: Knight Commander's Cross
 Pakistan: Hilal-i-Quaid-Azam Peace Award
 Israel: Leadership Award
 Venezuela: Order of Andrés Bello
 Mexico: National Recognition Award
 Bulgaria: Jubilee Medal
 Belgium: Order of the Crown.
 John Jay Award (1981) from Columbia College, his alma mater

Personal life 

Hammer was the middle of three sons. He had close relationships, including in business, with his brothers, Harry and Victor Hammer, throughout their lives.

He married three times, first in 1927, to a Russian actress, Olga Vadimovna von Root, the daughter of a czarist general. In 1943, he was married to Angela Zevely. In 1956, he married the wealthy widow Frances Barrett, and they remained married until her death in 1989.

He had only one child, his son Julian Armand Hammer, by his first wife. Hammer's grandson is businessman Michael Armand Hammer; his great-grandson is actor Armie Hammer.

Hammer died of bone marrow cancer in December 1990, aged 92 in Los Angeles. He was buried in Westwood Village Memorial Park Cemetery, across the street from his Occidental building on Wilshire Boulevard.

See also
Cyrus Eaton
List of people pardoned or granted clemency by the president of the United States

Publications
Articles
 "On a Vast China Market." Journal of International Affairs, vol. 39, no. 2: China in Transition (Winter 1986): 19–25. .

Books
 The Quest of the Romanoff Treasure. William Farquhar Payson (1932). 241 pages.
 Hammer. Los Angeles: Perigee Books, 1988. Co-authored by Neil Lyndon.
 Reviewed by Tom Gainor, VP of Federal Reserve Bank of Minneapolis. “Hammer: Odyssey of an Entrepreneur”, The Region, August 1987.

Further reading
Biographical profiles
 Ingham, John N. Biographical Dictionary of American Business Leaders, Vol. 2: H–M. Greenwood Press (1983): 533–536. .
 Tycoons and Entrepreneurs. New York: Macmillan Library Reference USA (1998): 87–92. .

Books
 Cosidine, Bob The Remarkable Life of Dr. Armand Hammer. New York: Harper & Row, 1975. . 287 pages.
 Bryson, John. The World of Armand Hammer. Abrams, 1985. . 255 pages.
 Weinberg, Steve. Armand Hammer: The Untold Story. Boston: Little, Brown, 1989. . 501 pages.
 Blumay, Carl. Dark Side of Power: The Real Armand Hammer. New York: Simon & Schuster (November 1992). . 494 pages.
 Epstein, Edward Jay. Dossier: The Secret History of Armand Hammer. New York: Random House (1996). . 418 pages.
 C-SPAN Booknotes interview with author Edward Jay Epstein (January 5, 1997).

Catalogs
 Denver Art Museum. The Armand Hammer Collection: Four Centuries of Masterpieces. An exhibition catalog (February 18–April 9, 1978).

Novels
 Triantafyllou, Soti. To Ergostassio ton Molivion [The Pencil Factory] (in Greek). Patakis (2000).

Notes

References

Bibliography

External links

 
 Interview with Epstein on occasion of the publication of "Dossier: The Secret History of Armand Hammer", C-SPAN
 Armand Hammer Collection at UCLA

American chief executives of energy companies
Jewish American art collectors
People in the petroleum industry
1898 births
1990 deaths
Museum founders
Armand
Hammer Museum
American people of Russian-Jewish descent
Businesspeople from Los Angeles
Columbia University Vagelos College of Physicians and Surgeons alumni
Deaths from bone cancer
Deaths from multiple myeloma
Deaths from cancer in California
People from Bel Air, Los Angeles
People from Manhattan
Philanthropists from California
Jewish American philanthropists
Recipients of American presidential pardons

United States National Medal of Arts recipients
Recipients of the Order of the Crown (Belgium)
Recipients of the Order of Friendship of Peoples
American expatriates in the Soviet Union
Burials at Westwood Village Memorial Park Cemetery
20th-century American businesspeople
Philanthropists from New York (state)
Recipients of the Four Freedoms Award
Columbia College (New York) alumni
American people of Ukrainian-Jewish descent